The Oboe Concerto in E-flat major is an oboe concerto by Carl Phillip Emanuel Bach composed in 1765.

Structure
The work is scored for solo oboe, strings and continuo in three movements:

I. Allegro
II. Adagio ma non troppo
III. Allegro ma non troppo

References

Oboe concertos
1765 compositions